Calumet County Park Group is an archaeological site in Calumet County, Wisconsin, United States. It consists of six effigy mounds of panthers and other water spirits and it is located at the top of the Niagara Escarpment where overlook Lake Winnebago. The group is located within the Calumet County Park approximately 2 miles northwest of Stockbridge. The mounds are consistent with other mound groups found at the peak of the Niagara Escarpment along the eastern shore of Lake Winnebago, including the High Cliff Mounds. It was listed on the National Register of Historic Places in 1997.

References

External links
Map at the Wisconsin Department of Tourism

Archaeological sites on the National Register of Historic Places in Wisconsin
Buildings and structures in Calumet County, Wisconsin
County parks in Wisconsin
Niagara Escarpment
Native American history of Wisconsin
National Register of Historic Places in Calumet County, Wisconsin
Mounds in Wisconsin